Yado Massaya Mambo (born 22 October 1991) is an English footballer who plays as a defender for Hampton & Richmond Borough. He started his career at Charlton Athletic for whom he featured in a number of cup matches, and also spent time on loan in the Football League for AFC Wimbledon and Shrewsbury Town in 2012/13 season.

Career

Charlton Athletic
Mambo started his career in Charlton Athletic's youth academy, and on turning professional went on numerous loans to non-league sides Welling United, Dover Athletic, Staines Town, Eastbourne Borough, and Ebbsfleet United.

Having signed a one-year contract extension at Charlton in July 2012, Mambo went on further loan deals at AFC Wimbledon in League Two and Shrewsbury Town in League One but was released at the end of the season. Mambo subsequently went on trial at Colchester United in July 2013 but was not offered a deal after suffering an knee injury during his trial.

Ebbsfleet United
After a period out of the game, Mambo rejoined his former loan club Ebbsfleet United, now playing in the Conference South on 1 February 2014, initially on non-contract terms.

Margate

On 29 May 2016, Mambo signed for Margate.

Ebbsfleet United

Mambo re-joined Ebbsfleet, where their failings to give him the number 5 shirt (in reference to the famous 1999 hit Mambo No. 5) went viral. After the social media outcry, he did don the shirt for a match, the shirt was then auctioned off. Mambo retired through injury aged 26 in late 2017.

Wealdstone
After he was given the all-clear to play part-time, Mambo joined Wealdstone on non-contract terms in the summer of 2018.

References

External links
 
 

Living people
1991 births
Footballers from Kilburn, London
Association football defenders
English footballers
Charlton Athletic F.C. players
Welling United F.C. players
Dover Athletic F.C. players
Staines Town F.C. players
Eastbourne Borough F.C. players
Ebbsfleet United F.C. players
AFC Wimbledon players
Shrewsbury Town F.C. players
Chelmsford City F.C. players
Hayes & Yeading United F.C. players
Margate F.C. players
English Football League players
Wealdstone F.C. players
Hampton & Richmond Borough F.C. players
National League (English football) players